The Rt Hon. Jacob Bright (26 May 1821 – 7 November 1899) was a British Liberal politician serving as Mayor of Rochdale and later Member of Parliament for Manchester.

Background
Bright was born at Green Bank near Rochdale, Lancashire. He was the fourth of eleven children of Jacob Bright and Martha Wood. His father was a Quaker and had established a cotton-spinning business at Fieldhouse. His elder brother, John Bright, was a radical politician, and his sister, Priscilla Bright McLaren, campaigned for women's rights.

Jacob Bright was educated at the Friends School in York before entering the family business of John Bright & Brothers, cotton-spinners. Bright and his brother Thomas managed the firm, and by 1885 the business had expanded into carpet manufacture. He was also responsible for introducing the linotype machine to England.

Career

Civic politics
Bright became involved in radical politics and supported Chartism. He was the first mayor of Rochdale on the town's incorporation as a municipal borough. He stood for election in 1865 in Manchester. Although unsuccessful on his first attempt, he won a by-election in 1867. The election was notable because Lilly Maxwell voted for Bright. This vote by a woman was later overturned.

National politics
Bright held his seat at the general election in 1868. He lost his seat at the 1874 general election, but was returned to parliament at the by-election in 1876. When the three-seat Parliamentary Borough of Manchester was divided into eight single-seat constituencies in 1885, Bright was selected as the Liberal candidate for the new Manchester South West constituency. He was defeated in 1885, but successful in the general election in 1886. As a Member of Parliament, Bright was considered an "advanced radical". He was a peace campaigner and supported women's suffrage.

Bright remained as MP for South West Manchester until in 1895. Upon retirement, Bright was sworn into the privy council at the suggestion of Lord Rosebery. Jacob Bright died at midnight on 7/8 November 1899, aged 78, at his residence, "Nunn's Acre", Goring-on-Thames, Oxfordshire. He was cremated without a funeral service. The central committee of the Society for Women's Suffrage passed a resolution recognising his contribution to the movement.

Family
In 1855, Bright married Ursula Mellor Bright, daughter of a Liverpool merchant and campaigner for women's rights. They had three children.

References

External links 

1821 births
1899 deaths
Liberal Party (UK) MPs for English constituencies
Members of the Privy Council of the United Kingdom
UK MPs 1865–1868
UK MPs 1868–1874
UK MPs 1874–1880
UK MPs 1880–1885
UK MPs 1886–1892
UK MPs 1892–1895
Mayors of Rochdale
Members of the Parliament of the United Kingdom for Manchester
British women's rights activists